The 2015 National Premier Soccer League season was the 103rd season of FIFA-sanctioned soccer in the United States, and the 13th season of the NPSL. Sixty eight clubs competed in the semi-professional soccer leagues.

Changes from 2014

New teams

Withdrew / On Hiatus

Standings

Northeast Region

Mid Atlantic Conference

North Atlantic Conference

Keystone Conference

South Region

South Atlantic Conference

South Central Conference

Southeast Conference

Sunshine Conference

Midwest Region

West Region

Golden Gates Conference

Northwest Conference

Southwest Conference

Playoffs

Southeast Conference Playoffs

Bold = winner* = after extra time, = penalty shootout score

Regional and National Playoffs

Note: Teams in national semifinal were reseeded and paired based on those seeds (1 vs. 4, 2 vs. 3).
Bold = winner* = after extra time, = penalty shootout score

NPSL League Awards

References

 
2015
2015 in American soccer leagues